Philip John Remnant, 4th Baron Remnant (born 20 December 1954) is a British hereditary peer and Conservative politician. In a July 2022 by-election, he was elected to replace Lord Brabazon of Tara in the House of Lords following Brabazon of Tara's retirement in April 2022.

References

External links

1954 births
Living people
Conservative Party (UK) hereditary peers
Barons in the Peerage of the United Kingdom
Hereditary peers elected under the House of Lords Act 1999